Sir Charles Harris  (2 March 1864 – 10 June 1943)  was a senior civil servant in the British War Office.

Harris was born in Ivybridge, Devon, and was educated at Bradford Grammar School and Balliol College, Oxford. He joined the War Office in 1887, being promoted to Principal Clerk in 1900 and Assistant Financial Secretary, in charge of the Finance Department, in 1908. He held the latter position until his retirement in 1924, also being Joint Secretary to the War Office from 1920.

Harris was appointed Companion of the Order of the Bath (CB) in the 1911 Coronation Honours, Knight Commander of the Order of the Bath (KCB) in 1913, and Knight Grand Cross of the Order of the British Empire (GBE) in the 1920 civilian war honours.

Footnotes

References
Obituary, The Times, 11 June 1943

1864 births
1943 deaths
People from Ivybridge
Alumni of Balliol College, Oxford
Permanent Under-Secretaries of State for War
Knights Grand Cross of the Order of the British Empire
Knights Commander of the Order of the Bath
People educated at Bradford Grammar School